Teneng Mba Jaiteh is a Gambian politician who serves as Gambia's ambassador to the European Union as well as 7 of its member states.

Early life and education
Jaiteh was educated at the University of Sierra Leone's Fourabay College and the London School of Economics. She has a BA in History and an MSc in Development Studies.

Career
Jaiteh served as Deputy State Secretary in The Gambia's Department of Finance and Economic Affairs in 2003, and as Secretary General of the Civil Service from 2008 to 2009, replacing Ousman Jammeh in the post.

On 29 May 2009, Jaiteh was appointed Deputy Minister of Petroleum and Mineral Resources by President Yahya Jammeh. She was later appointed Minister of Energy, but was relieved of that appointment on 17 February 2014 when Jammeh said the portfolio would come under his office. She became one of nearly 200 cabinet ministers and government officials to be hired and fired by Jammeh since he came to power in a 1994 coup. She was reinstated three days later.

In January 2015, Jaiteh was appointed as Gambia's ambassador to the European Union, also covering (Germany), Poland, Netherlands, Luxembourg, Slovakia and the Czech Republic as well as the Organisation for the Prohibition of Chemical Weapons, African, Caribbean and Pacific Group of States, the International Criminal Court and the World Trade Organization. Her post is located in Brussels.

After the December 2016 election, Jaiteh was one of a dozen Gambian diplomats who backed President-elect Adama Barrow as the legitimate president and called on Jammeh to step down, sending a joint congratulatory letter to Barrow. In response, Jammeh's new Information Minister, Seedy Njie said in January 2017 that the twelve ambassadors had been fired.

References

Living people
Gambian women diplomats
Government ministers of the Gambia
Ambassadors of the Gambia to the European Union
Ambassadors of the Gambia to Belgium
Ambassadors of the Gambia to Luxembourg
Ambassadors of the Gambia to the Netherlands
Ambassadors of the Gambia to Germany
Ambassadors of the Gambia to Poland
Ambassadors of the Gambia to the Czech Republic
Ambassadors of the Gambia to Slovakia
Permanent Representatives of the Gambia to the Organisation for the Prohibition of Chemical Weapons
Permanent Representatives to the World Trade Organization
Alumni of the London School of Economics
Gambian women ambassadors
Women government ministers of the Gambia
21st-century Gambian women politicians
21st-century Gambian politicians
Year of birth missing (living people)